Maki Ikaika Maleko Pitolo (born November 24, 1990) is an American mixed martial artist who competes in the Middleweight division. A professional mixed martial artist since 2013, Pitolo has also competed for the Ultimate Fighting Championship and Bellator MMA.

Background
Pitolo played football in high school, and started training mixed martial arts to stay in shape during the offseason. Eventually after seeing Forrest Griffin vs. Stephan Bonnar, he decided to pursue a career in the sport. He has a little brother Alphonso, who is also a mixed martial artist.

Mixed martial arts career

Early career
In the beginning of his mixed martial arts career, Pitolo fought primarily in Hawaii regional scene. After racking up a record of 6–2, he fought five times for the Victory Fighting Championship where he amassed three straight wins before getting stopped in two consecutive fights. After the tenure in VFC, Pitolo faced Thiago Rela at CFFC 68 on October 21, 2017, winning the fight via first-minute knockout. He was expected to face Stephen Regman at CFFC 70 on March 24, 2018, but the bout was cancelled. 

Pitolo was scheduled to face Chibwikem Onyenegecha at Dana White's Contender Series 13 on July 17, 2018, but a shoulder injury forced him to withdraw from the bout and he was replaced by Anthony Adams.

Bellator
After the one-off bout in Cage Fury FC, Pitolo faced Chris Cisneros in a rematch at Bellator 213 on December 15, 2018. He won the fight via third-round submission.

DWCS and Ultimate Fighting Championship
After the lone bout in Bellator, Pitolo was once again invited to Dana White's Contender Series. Pitolo faced Justin Sumter at Dana White's Contender Series 19 on July 9, 2019. He won the fight via first round technical knockout and was awarded a UFC contract.

As per Dana White's wish after the bout, Maki made his return to welterweight in his UFC debut and faced Callan Potter on 5 October 2019 at UFC 243. He lost the fight via unanimous decision.

Pitolo was scheduled to face Takashi Sato at UFC Fight Night 168 on February 23, 2020. However, Pitolo was unable to make weight and the bout was scrapped from the card.

Due to the botched weight cut preceding the previous fight, Pitolo returned to Middleweight division for his next fight against Charles Byrd at UFC 250 on June 6, 2020. He won the bout via second round technical knockout,

Pitolo faced Darren Stewart on 8 August 2020 at UFC Fight Night 174. He lost in the first round via guillotine choke.

Pitolo was tabbed for a quick turnaround and faced promotional newcomer Impa Kasanganay on August 29, 2020 at UFC Fight Night: Smith vs. Rakić. He lost the fight via unanimous decision.

Pitolo faced Julian Marquez on February 13, 2021 at UFC 258. He lost the bout via an anaconda choke in the third round.

Pitolo was scheduled to face Duško Todorović on June 5, 2021 at UFC Fight Night: Rozenstruik vs. Sakai. However, two weeks ahead of the bout, Pitolo had to pull out due to unknown reasons and was replaced by Gregory Rodrigues.

The bout between Pitolo and  Todorović was rescheduled on December 4, 2021 at UFC on ESPN 31. He lost the fight via technical knockout in round one.

On January 12, 2022, it was announced that Pitolo was no longer on the UFC roster.

Post-UFC 
Pitolo made his first appeareance outside of the UFC at Tuff-N-Uff 127 on March 4, 2022, facing Fernando Gonzalez. He won the bout via unanimous decision.

Pitolo made his debut with Eagle FC against Doug Usher on May 20, 2022 at Eagle FC 47. At weigh ins, Maki Pitolo and Doug Usher missed weight and the bout changed from Middleweight to Light Heavyweight. Pitolo weighed in at 187.4 pounds while Usher weighed in at 189 pounds. Pitolo won by knockout in the opening minute of the fight.

Pitolo faced Daniel Compton on November 20, 2022 at Tuff-N-Uff 130 for the TUFF Middleweight Championship. He was submitted in the third round by the way of a kimura, after which Compton went into the crowd to confront Pitolo's fans.

Personal life
Maki and his wife Chasity have two children, Miya and Madyx.

Mixed martial arts record

|-
|Loss
|align=center|15–10
|Daniel Compton
|Submission (kimura)
|Tuff-N-Uff 130
|
|align=center|3
|align=center|1:39
|Las Vegas, Nevada, United States
|
|-
|Win
|align=center|15–9
|Doug Usher
|KO (punches)
|Eagle FC 47
|
|align=center|1
|align=center|0:30
|Miami, Florida, United States
|
|-
|Win
|align=center| 14–9
|Fernando Gonzalez
|Decision (unanimous)
|Tuff-N-Uff 127
|
|align=center|3
|align=center|5:00
|Las Vegas, Nevada, United States
|
|-
|Loss
|align=center|13–9
|Duško Todorović
|TKO (punches)
|UFC on ESPN: Font vs. Aldo 
|
|align=center|1
|align=center|4:34
|Las Vegas, Nevada, United States
| 
|-
|Loss
|align=center|13–8
|Julian Marquez
| Submission (anaconda choke)
|UFC 258 
|
|align=center|3
|align=center|4:17
|Las Vegas, Nevada, United States
|
|-
|Loss
|align=center|13–7
|Impa Kasanganay
|Decision (unanimous)
|UFC Fight Night: Smith vs. Rakić
|
|align=center|3
|align=center|5:00
|Las Vegas, Nevada, United States
|
|-
| Loss
| align=center|13–6
|Darren Stewart
| Submission (guillotine choke)
| UFC Fight Night: Lewis vs. Oleinik
| 
| align=center|1
| align=center|3:41
| Las Vegas, Nevada, United States
|
|-
| Win
| align=center| 13–5
| Charles Byrd	
| TKO (punches)
|UFC 250
|
|align=center|2
|align=center|1:10
|Las Vegas, Nevada, United States
|
|-
| Loss
| align=center| 12–5
| Callan Potter
| Decision (unanimous)
|UFC 243
|
|align=center|3
|align=center|5:00
|Melbourne, Australia
|
|-
| Win
| align=center| 12–4
| Justin Michael Sumter
| TKO (punches)
| Dana White's Contender Series 19
| 
| align=center| 1
| align=center| 1:37
| Las Vegas, Nevada, United States
| 
|-
| Win
| align=center| 11–4
| Chris Cisneros
| Submission (rear-naked choke)
| Bellator 213
| 
| align=center| 3
| align=center| 2:40
| Honolulu, Hawaii, United States
| 
|-
| Win
| align=center| 10–4
| Thiago Rela
| KO (punch)
| Cage Fury FC 68
| 
| align=center| 1
| align=center| 0:59
| Atlantic City, New Jersey, United States
| 
|-
| Loss
| align=center| 9–4
| Dakota Cochrane
| Submission (guillotine choke)
| Victory FC 58
| 
| align=center| 2
| align=center| 4:58
| Omaha, Nebraska, United States
|
|-
| Loss
| align=center| 9–3
| Kassius Kayne
| KO (punch)
| Victory FC 54
| 
| align=center| 2
| align=center| 0:05
| Omaha, Nebraska, United States
|
|-
| Win
| align=center|9–2
| Kassius Kayne
| Decision (unanimous)
| Victory FC 52
| 
| align=center|5
| align=center|5:00
| Omaha, Nebraska, United States
|
|-
| Win
| align=center|8–2
| Justin Guthrie
| TKO (punches)
| Victory FC 50
| 
| align=center|1
| align=center|0:48
| Topeka, Kansas, United States
|
|-
| Win
| align=center|7–2
| Andrews Nakahara
| TKO (punches)
| Victory FC 49
| 
| align=center|2
| align=center|2:21
| Omaha, Nebraska, United States
|
|-
| Win
| align=center|6–2
| Adam Smith
| Submission (guillotine choke)
| Destiny MMA: Na Koa 9
| 
| align=center|1
| align=center|3:23
| Honolulu, Hawaii, United States
|
|-
| Win
| align=center| 5–2
| Pono Pananganan
| TKO (punches)
| Ainofea Cage Fights
| 
| align=center|1
| align=center|2:44
| Lihue, Hawaii, United States
| 
|-
| Win
| align=center| 4–2
| Paul Norman
| TKO (punches)
| RWE: Just Scrap
|
|align=Center|1
|align=center|4:31
|Hilo, Hawaii, United States
| 
|-
| Win
| align=center| 3–2
| Taki Uluilakepa
| Submission (rear-naked choke)
| Destiny MMA: Na Koa 7
| 
| align=center| 2
| align=center| N/A
| Honolulu, Hawaii, United States
| 
|-
| Win
| align=center| 2–2
| Coates Cobb-Adams
| Decision (unanimous)
| X–1: Jara vs. Vitale
| 
| align=center| 3
| align=center| 5:00
| Honolulu, Hawaii, United States
| 
|-
| Loss
| align=center| 1–2
| C.J. Marsh
| TKO (punches)
| Destiny MMA: Na Koa 5
| 
| align=center| 1
| align=center| N/A
| Honolulu, Hawaii, United States
| 
|-
| Loss
| align=center| 1–1
| Chris Cisneros
| Submission (armbar)
| Destiny MMA: Proving Grounds 2
| 
| align=center| 1
| align=center| N/A
| Honolulu, Hawaii, United States
|
|-
| Win
| align=center| 1–0
| Jason Camarillo
| Decision (unanimous)
| X–1: Mayhem at the Mansion 4
| 
| align=center| 3
| align=center| 5:00
| Puhi, Hawaii, United States
|

See also 
 List of male mixed martial artists

References

External links 
  
 

American male mixed martial artists
1990 births
Living people
Welterweight mixed martial artists
Middleweight mixed martial artists
Ultimate Fighting Championship male fighters
Mixed martial artists from Hawaii
Sportspeople from Honolulu